Tamara Bowie (born June 3, 1981) is an American former professional basketball player. In 2007, she was named the Úrvalsdeild kvenna Foreign Player of the Year after leading the league in scoring and rebounds. She played professionally in Iceland, Latvia, Israel, Greece and Bulgaria, where she won the national championship in 2011.

College career
Bowie played college basketball for the Ball State Cardinals from 1999 to 2003. She left the school as its all-time leading scorer with 2,091 career points, which ranks seventh all-time in Mid-American Conference history, and set the Ball State single-season scoring record with 618 points in the 2002–03 season. She was named the MAC Player of the Year recipient (2001-02 & 2002-03) becoming the only Cardinal to win the award multiple times. She was named Kodak/WBCA Honorable Mention All-America three times during her career.

Ball State statistics

Source

Professional career
Bowie signed with Grindavík in September 2006. On January 13, she participated in the Icelandic All-Star game, scoring 12 points. On January 17, 2007, she scored 36 points and grabbed a season high 27 rebounds in a victory against Keflavík. She left Grindavík for personal reasons in the playoffs after averaging 31.7 points in the first three games of Grindavík's best-of-five semi-finals series against Keflavík. After the season she was named the Úrvalsdeild Foreign Player of the Year. For the season she led the league in both scoring and rebounds with 30.5 points and 14.8 rebounds per game.

She spent the 2007–2008 season with Hapoel Tel Aviv, averaging 24.9 points and 12.5 rebounds per game. In March 2008, she signed as a free agent with the Minnesota Lynx but did not end making the opening day roster.

She played with WBC Neftokhimik Burgas during the 2010–2011 season, helping the team win the Bulgarian Women's Basketball Championship.

References

External link
Profile at Eurobasket.com

1981 births
Living people
Ball State Cardinals women's basketball players
American expatriate basketball people in Iceland
American expatriate basketball people in Israel
American women's basketball players
Tamara Bowie
Tamara Bowie
Forwards (basketball)